The 1997 Denmark Open in badminton was held in Vejle, from October 15 to October 19, 1997. It was a four-star tournament and the prize money was US$120,000.

Venue
Vejle, Denmark

Final results

References

Denmark Open
Denmark